Christina Ioanna Bourmpou (born 21 October 2000) is a Greek rower from Thessaloniki. Along with Maria Kyridou, she won four gold medals for Greece in just over four months. The last one, was the gold medal at the 2018 Summer Youth Olympics. Bourmpou participated – along with Kyridou – at the 2020 Olympics, reaching the final and eventually taking the fifth place.

References

External links
 
 
 

2000 births
Living people
Greek female rowers
Rowers at the 2018 Summer Youth Olympics
Youth Olympic gold medalists for Greece
Rowers at the 2020 Summer Olympics
Rowers from Thessaloniki